Donald Rukare (born 4 November 1968) is a Ugandan lawyer, lecturer.  Currently serves as the Chairperson of National Council of Sports of Uganda since 16 February 2020 as well he serves  as the President of  Uganda Olympic Committee. He serves as an advocate of the High Court of Uganda and of recent served as the President of the Uganda Swimming Federation. He is currently the Chief of Party of the USAID Rights and Rule of Project in Uganda.

Early life and education
Rukare graduated with a  Doctor of Law (LLD) from the University of Pretoria in  South Africa, has a Masters of Law (LLM) from Lund University  Sweden, has  post-graduate diplomas in international law, development and legal practice, a Bachelor of Laws from Makerere University as well as a master's degree in Sports Law from ISDE Law and Business School in Madrid. Donald also holds an Executive Masters in Sports Management from the University of Louvain, Belgium, and has taken leadership and strategic management courses at the Harvard Kennedy School of Government and Harvard Business School in the US, as well as an international sports law program at Cambridge University in the UK.

Career

Corporate
Rukare has served in various positions such as a Head of Program Manager of European Union Human Right,  as a Legal Advisor to Embassy of Ireland. He serves as an advocate of the High Court of Uganda, as a part-time lecturer in Sports Law at the Uganda Christian University in Mukono and is a regular guest faculty at the International Law Institute Kampala and the Center for Human Rights Pretoria University in South Africa. He is an external examiner at both Makerere University and Pretoria University. Rukare is a MEMOS lecturer of Governance teaching Sports Governance and Management on the International Olympic Committee Executive Masters Program (MEMOS). He also teaches International Sports Law at ISDE Law and Business School. He is currently the Chief of Party of the USAID Rights and Rule of Project  in Uganda.

Sports
Rukare has been a semi pro swimmer for 10 years and represented Uganda in swimming competitions.  In 2005, he was elected as the president for Uganda Swimming Federation replacing Jerry Dralga. On 16 February 2020, Rukare was appointed by Minister of Sports  to serve as the chairperson for National Council of Sports of Uganda
In February 2021, Rukare was elected as the President of Uganda Olympic Committee replacing William Blick.

Committee memberships
Rukare is a former national swimmer and currently holds a number of sports positions including Chairperson of the National Council of Sports, former President of the Uganda Swimming Federation, Vice President of the African Swimming Federation (CANA), International Swimming Federation (FINA) Bureau member representing Africa, former board chair of Special Olympics Uganda, the Secretary General of the Uganda Olympic Committee. He is also an arbitrator of the International Court of Arbitration for Sport (CAS), a panel member of the results management panel of the Regional Anti-Doping Agency (RADO), a member of the Commonwealth Games Federation Ethics Commission and is a MEMOS Professor, teaching Governance and Sports Management on the IOC MEMOS Master's program in addition to an International Olympic Committee (IOC) consultant/advisor that has undertaken assignments for the IOC in Ghana, Kenya, Nigeria and Lesotho. Rukare is also a board member of World Voices a local Non-Government Organisation in Uganda that works in the Justice and human rights space.

Other considerations
Rukare has served as a consultant to the World Bank, African Union, Ireland Aid, Danida, International Law Institute. He has written and published  several articles on among others human rights, governance and  personal branding that have featured in the print media in Uganda and has been invited to speak and present papers on governance, human rights and  personal branding by various institutions across the world.

References

External links
Donald Rukare on National Council of Sports website
Uganda Olympic Committee: ANOC
Uganda Swimming Federation gets new President
Donald Rukare appointed new NCS chairman | Swift Sports Uganda
Rukare replaces Onyik as NCS Boss

1968 births
Sportspeople from Kampala
Living people
Makerere University alumni
People from Central Region, Uganda